Small Town Murder Songs is a 2010 Canadian neo-noir crime film directed by Ed Gass-Donnelly. The film premiered at the Toronto International Film Festival on September 14, 2010. The film is written by Gass-Donnelly, produced by Gass-Donnelly and Lee Kim, and stars Peter Stormare, Jill Hennessy, and Martha Plimpton.

Small Town Murder Songs was shot in Conestogo Lake, Listowel, Baden, Ontario and Palmerston in Ontario, Canada.

The film has been given a limited theatrical release in the United States beginning on May 26, 2011.

Plot
"A modern, gothic tale of crime and redemption about an aging police officer from a small Ontario Mennonite town who hides a violent past until a local murder upsets the calm of his newly reformed life."

Stephen Holden, writing for The New York Times, explained the story:

Cast
 Peter Stormare as Walter
 Martha Plimpton as Sam
 Aaron Poole as Jim
 Jill Hennessy as Rita
 Jackie Burroughs as Olive
 Ari Cohen as Washington
 Stephen Eric McIntyre as Steve
 Trent McMullen as Officer Kevin
 Alexandria Benoit as Sarah
 Amy Rutherford as Ava
 Kat Germain as Jenny

Release
Monterey Media acquired the United States distribution rights in 2011. The limited United States theatrical release began at the O-Cinema in Wynwood, Miami, Florida. Monterey Media release the film on DVD in July 2011.

Festivals
Small Town Murder Songs was selected at the following film festivals:

 Santa Catalina Film Festival - Winner Best Feature
 Phoenix Film Festival - World Cinema Director
 Whistler Film Festival - WINNER Best Actress
 Torino Film Festival - WINNER Fipresci Critic’s Prize Best Film
 International Film Festival Rotterdam
 Toronto International Film Festival
 Hamptons International Film Festival
 Cucalorus Film Festival
 Palm Springs International Film Festival
 Santa Barbara International Film Festival
 Cinequest Film Festival
 Miami International Film Festival
 Cleveland International Film Festival
 Vail Film Festival
 Dallas International Film Festival
 Minneapolis-St. Paul International Film Festival
 Reel Dakota Film Society/Film Festival
 Seattle International Film Festival
 Indianapolis International Film Festival

Reception

On Rotten Tomatoes, the film has an approval rating of 79%, based on reviews from 19 critics, with an average score of 6.07/10. On Metacritic, the film has a score of 66 out of 100, based on reviews from 10 critics, indicating "generally favorable reviews".

Stephen Cole from The Globe and Mail wrote a positive review, saying, "STMS succeeds as an Ontario Gothic mood piece".
Michael Rechtshafen of The Hollywood Reporter wrote that Small Town Murder Songs is "An effective ensemble backed by a bracingly haunting soundtrack" after its screening at the Santa Barbara International Film Festival; he also saw similarities with Winter's Bone and found "much to admire about this carefully drawn but concise character sketch, especially the strong performances and a unique, affectingly ominous score by folk-rock-gospel outfit Bruce Peninsula... The already dense ambience gets progressively heavier as the investigation continues, with Gass-Donnelly keeping a tight grip on the artful compositions. But as strong as those visuals are, what really ends up lingering long after the lights come up, is that Greek chorus of a soundtrack, its fire-and-brimstone, gothic-tinged take on traditional and original spirituals packing an unsettling, pious punch."

Dustin Hucks with Ain't It Cool News also saw the film at The Santa Barbara International Film Festival and said, "Small Town Murder Songs is definitely a winner in the stable of films showing at the Santa Barbara International Film Festival this year".
Holden of the New York Times wrote that the film "is not really a whodunit but a character study of a man squeezed in a psychological, spiritual and professional vise... Small Town Murder Songs is compellingly acted from top to bottom. As the raw passions of its hard-bitten characters seep into you, the songs hammer them even more deeply into your consciousness. The film's only flaw — a big one — is its brevity. When it ends after 76 minutes, you are left wishing it had included Walter's back story and had offered a more detailed picture of the town."

Shannon from Movie Moxie had wonderful things to say about the film: "The powerful score sets an impressive and all-encompassing atmosphere to the film". Robert Bell from Exclaim! had pleasant things to say about the film, stating that there were "some impressive cinematography and an understanding of tone through stillness and minor stylization make for a pleasant experience aesthetically". Howard Feinstein from Screen Daily praised writer/director Gass-Donnelly: "Ed Gass-Donnelly makes appropriate, unpretentiously artful, stylistic choices in this tale of redemption".

Alison Willmore of The A.V. Club, gave the film a grade B, with particular praise for the songs: "Who's responsible for the killing is never much of a mystery in Small Town Murder Songs; there are no dark conspiracies, only dark natures. The tension instead focuses on whether Stormare will be able to rein himself in when the investigation inexorably pulls him toward his old life. Everyone is so restrained, their turmoil buried so deep, that the depth of what they're feeling has to be excavated from what's left unsaid."

Awards

It won Best Feature at the 2011 Santa Catalina Film Festival and won Fipresci Critic’s Prize Best Film at the 2010 Torino International Film Festival.

Martha Plimpton won Best Actress at the 2010 Whistler International Film Festival for her performance in this film.
Ed Gass-Donnelly won World Cinema Director at the 2011 Phoenix Film Festival.

References

External links
 
 

English-language Canadian films
Canadian independent films
2010 films
2010 crime drama films
2010 crime thriller films
Canadian crime drama films
Canadian crime thriller films
Mennonitism in Canada
Mennonitism in popular culture
Films directed by Ed Gass-Donnelly
2010s Canadian films